Anatoly Grigoriyevich Brovko (born 22 August 1966) is a Russian politician who served as the Governor of Volgograd Oblast in 2010-2012.

Brovko was born in Dnipropetrovsk Oblast, Ukrainian SSR.  In 1985, he finished Donetsk Polytechnic Institute. In February 2009, Brovko was included in the list of the "First 100" of the High-Potential Management Personnel Reserve, a program announced by Russian President Dmitry Medvedev on 23 July 2008.

References

1966 births
Living people
People from Dnipropetrovsk Oblast
United Russia politicians
21st-century Russian politicians
Governors of Volgograd Oblast